Madam Fuli is a 1999 Bangladeshi film directed by Shahidul Islam Khokon. It stars debutants Shimla and Alexander Bo in lead roles while Bobita and Humayun Faridi in supporting roles. It is a female-centric film, which is rarely seen in Bangladeshi Cinema. Shimla won Bangladesh National Film Award for Best Actress for her portrayal of 'Fuli'. Upon doing so, she has become the only Bangladeshi actor, male or female, to win National Film Award for debut performance. ATM Shamsuzzaman won the Bangladesh National Film Awards for Best Comedian. This film is loosely based on 1988 Hindi film Khoon Bhari Maang, starring Rekha in the lead roles.

Synopsis
Fuli (Simla) is an uneducated village girl. She lives in a village hut with her elderly mother. An influential person of the village was about to drown due to epilepsy and was about to drown. The influential man is very grateful to her and in return gives her in marriage to his son. However, his son Sohail (Alexander Bo) does not consider Phuli as his wife and he falls in love with another girl named Fancy. Fuli came to Dhaka to live with her husband after marriage. Sohail does not give her proper rights as a wife. It is ugly to look at and is insulted by friends for singing. He accidentally gets lost and is found by his mother Salma. Salma (Babita) teaches him to be modern and smart and come back. An illiterate rural girl makes herself modern and clever to get her husband's rights. Later, her husband became interested in getting her back.

Cast 
 Alexander Bo - Mizanur Rahman Sohel
 Shimla - Fuli / Shimla
 Michela - Fancy
 Babita - Salma
 Humayun Faridi - Kalam Ali
 ATM Shamsuzzaman - Dad
 Sheikh Abul Kashem Mithun - Shahid
 Khalil Ullah Khan - Matbar
 Rasheda Chowdhury - Rahima

Music 
The film's songs have been composed by Alam Khan and penned by Milton Khondokar.

"Monke Boli Tomari Kotha Jotobar" - Kanak Chapa and Agun

Awards

References

External links 
 

1999 films
1999 drama films
Bengali-language Bangladeshi films
Bangladeshi drama films
1990s Bengali-language films
Films scored by Alam Khan